Kang Un-ju (born 1 February 1995) is a North Korean recurve archer.

Kang made her debut in international competition at the 2013 Archery World Cup qualifying round in Shanghai, China, and later that year joined the 2013 World Archery Championships in Antalya, Turkey.
She also participated in archery at the 2014 Asian Games.
The following year she competed in the individual recurve event and the team recurve event at the 2015 World Archery Championships in Copenhagen, Denmark.

Kang, a resident of Pyongyang, is right-handed.

See also

 Kwon Un-sil – 2012 North Korean Olympic archer
 Sport in North Korea

References

External links
 
 

North Korean female archers
Living people
Place of birth missing (living people)
1995 births
Archers at the 2014 Asian Games
Archers at the 2018 Asian Games
Asian Games medalists in archery
Asian Games silver medalists for North Korea
Medalists at the 2018 Asian Games
Archers at the 2016 Summer Olympics
Olympic archers of North Korea
21st-century North Korean women